Tiit Hennoste (born 12 August 1953 in Pärnu) is an Estonian philologist and linguist.

In 1985 he graduated from the University of Tartu.

His main topics of research are text studies and spoken language. He has created the model for text analysis; the central concept of the model is "cultural situation".

In 2018 he was awarded with the Order of the White Star, IV class.

Publications
 Ajalehe kujundamine (1994, with R. Kurvits)
 Uudise käsiraamat: kuidas otsida, kirjutada, toimetada ja serveerida ajaleheuudist (2001, 2009) 
 Eesti murded ja kohanimed (2002, 2009, one of the authors)
 Eurooplaseks saamine. Kõrvalkäija altkulmupilk: artikleid ja arvamusi 1986–2003 (2003)
 Dialoogiaktid eesti infodialoogides: tüpoloogia ja analüüs (2004, with A. Rääbis)
 Kommikoer ja pommikoer: üksteist lugu Eesti ajakirjandusest (2010)

References

Living people
1953 births
Linguists from Estonia
Estonian philologists
University of Tartu alumni
Academic staff of the University of Tartu
Academic staff of the University of Amsterdam
Academic staff of the University of Helsinki
Recipients of the Order of the White Star, 4th Class
People from Pärnu